The following is an incomplete list of association football clubs based on the island of Réunion.
For a complete list see :Category:Football clubs in Réunion

A
 FC Avirons

C
 SS Capricorne

E
 AS Excelsior

G
 SS Gauloise

J
 SS Jeanne d'Arc

M
 AS Marsouins

P
 AJ Petite-Ile

R
 SS Rivière Sport

S
 Saint-Denis FC
 Saint-Pauloise FC
 AS Saint-Louisienne
 US Sainte-Marienne
 JS Saint-Pierroise

T
 La Tamponnaise

Reunion
 
Football clubs

Football clubs